Martin Vladimirovich Malyutin (born 5 July 1999) is a Russian swimmer.  He has won medals at the European and World Championships.

Career
He competed at the 2018 European Aquatics Championships, winning the silver medal in both 4×200 m men's freestyle relay and 4×200 m mixed freestyle relay events.

At the 2019 World Aquatics Championships held in Gwangju, South Korea, Malyutin and Duncan Scott came joint fourth in the 200 m freestyle, but the first-placed finisher Danas Rapšys was disqualified for a false start, so both Malyutin and Scott were awarded a bronze medal.

References

1999 births
Living people
Russian male swimmers
Russian male freestyle swimmers
European Aquatics Championships medalists in swimming
World Aquatics Championships medalists in swimming
Swimmers at the 2020 Summer Olympics
Medalists at the 2020 Summer Olympics
Olympic silver medalists in swimming
Olympic silver medalists for the Russian Olympic Committee athletes
Medalists at the FINA World Swimming Championships (25 m)
Olympic swimmers of Russia